Streptomyces lydicus is a bacterium species from the genus of Streptomyces which has been isolated from soil in the United States. Streptomyces lydicus produces actithiazic acid, natamycin, lydimycin, streptolydigin, and 1-deoxygalactonojirimycin. Streptomyces lydicus can be used as an agent against fungal plant pathogens like Fusarium, Pythium, Phytophthora, Rhizoctonia and Verticillum.

See also 
 List of Streptomyces species

References

Further reading

External links
Type strain of Streptomyces lydicus at BacDive -  the Bacterial Diversity Metadatabase

lydicus
Bacteria described in 1956